Mohra Ni Luni is a town in the Islamabad Capital Territory of Pakistan. It is located at 33° 26' 10N  73° 23' 20E with an altitude of 523 metres (1719 feet).

References 

Union councils of Islamabad Capital Territory